Thomas Cheney or Cheyney (1694 – 27 January 1760) was a Church of England priest, who served as Dean of Lincoln from 1744 to 1748 and Dean of Winchester from 25 March 1748 to 1760. He was the only son of another Thomas Cheyney, prebendary of Wells Cathedral and master at Winchester College. Thomas junior was educated at Winchester College and New College, Oxford Winchester College's archives contain several letters to him.

Bibliography
G H Blore, Thomas Cheyney, Wykehamist, Dean of Winchester (Winchester: The Wykeham Press, 1950)

References

1694 births
1760 deaths
Deans of Winchester
Alumni of New College, Oxford
Deans of Lincoln
People educated at Winchester College
18th-century English Anglican priests